George Clinton Jr. (June 6, 1771 – September 16, 1809) was an American politician and lawyer who served as a U.S. representative from New York from 1805 to 1809.

Early life
He was born in New York City on June 6, 1771, the son of Mary De Witt and James Clinton, a brevet major general in the American Revolutionary War. He was the brother of DeWitt Clinton (1769–1828), the 6th governor of New York, and half-brother of James Graham Clinton, also a U.S. Representative.

He was the nephew of George Clinton (1739–1812), who served as the 1st and 3rd governor of New York from 1777 to 1795 and the U.S. Vice President from 1805 to 1812. His grandfather was Col. Charles Clinton (1690–1773), an Anglo-Irish colonel during the French and Indian War.

He graduated from Columbia College in 1793, studied law, and became an attorney.

Career
He was involved in farming and business in New York City and New Windsor, and was an incorporator of the Newburgh and Cochecton Turnpike Company.

Politics and elected office
Clinton was an early member of the Tammany Hall organization, including serving as one of its sachems.  He was a delegate to the New York State constitutional convention in 1801.  In political organizing and at conventions, George Clinton Jr. was a manager and leader of the allies of his uncle George, in opposition to adherents of Aaron Burr as the two groups fought for supremacy in the Democratic-Republican Party.

He served in the New York State Assembly from 1804 to 1805. He was elected to the United States House of Representatives as a Democratic-Republican to fill the vacancy caused when Samuel L. Mitchill resigned to accept election to the United States Senate. He was subsequently elected to two full terms, and served from February 14, 1805, to March 3, 1809.

While in Congress George Clinton was one of the signers of a document protesting the caucus which nominated James Madison as the candidate of the Democratic-Republicans for President in 1808.

Personal life
In 1801 George Clinton married Hannah Franklin (1788–1855).  His wife was the sister of DeWitt Clinton's first wife, Mary Franklin, and a descendant of John Bowne and Elizabeth Fones.  They had three children:
Mary Caroline Clinton (1802–1870), who married Henry Overing
Franklin Clinton, who died as a child
Julia Matilda Clinton (d. 1880), who first married George C. Tallmadge. She later married James Foster Jr.

George Clinton died at his home in the Bloomingdale area of New York City, aged 38, on September 16, 1809.

References

External links

1771 births
1809 deaths
American people of Dutch descent
American people of English descent
Politicians from New York City
People from New Windsor, New York
Columbia College (New York) alumni
New York (state) lawyers
Members of the New York State Assembly
Democratic-Republican Party members of the United States House of Representatives from New York (state)
Clinton family of New York
De Witt family